A list of films produced in Brazil in 1947:

See also
 1982 in Brazil

External links
Brazilian films of 1947 at the Internet Movie Database

Brazil
1947
Films